Grzegorz Kowalski (born 15 December 1977) is a retired Polish football defender.

References

1977 births
Living people
Polish footballers
Carbo Gliwice players
Ruch Radzionków players
Association football defenders
I liga players
Polish expatriate footballers
Expatriate footballers in Germany
Polish expatriate sportspeople in Germany